Leucographus albovarius is a species of beetle in the family Cerambycidae. It was described by Waterhouse in 1878.

Subspecies
 Leucographus albovarius albovarius Waterhouse, 1878
 Leucographus albovarius murinus Alluaud, 1900

References

Crossotini
Beetles described in 1878